Parade is the fourth studio album by English new wave band Spandau Ballet, released on 25 June 1984 by Chrysalis Records. The album contained two UK top-10 singles, "Only When You Leave" (number three) and "I'll Fly for You" (number nine).

Track listing

Personnel

Spandau Ballet
 Tony Hadley – lead and backing vocals 
 Gary Kemp – guitars, backing vocals 
 Martin Kemp – bass
 John Keeble – drums 
 Steve Norman – percussion, saxophones

Additional musician
 Jess Bailey – keyboards

Technical
 Spandau Ballet – production
 Steve Jolley – production 
 Tony Swain – production, engineering 
 Richard Lengyel – engineering assistance
 David Band – design, illustration
 Gary Kemp – design
 Eric Watson – band photography
 John Shaw – sleeve photography

Charts

Weekly charts

Year-end charts

Certifications

References

Bibliography

 

1984 albums
Albums produced by Jolley & Swain
Chrysalis Records albums
Spandau Ballet albums